Panagiotis Panagiotou (born 16 January 2002) is a Greek professional footballer who plays as a centre-back for Super League 2 club PAOK B.

Career

Early career
Panagiotis Panagiotou is a central defender with many talents. Strength and excellent technical ability are main features of his game, and he can play just as well as a defensive midfielder, which he has done in the past. Acquired from Giannina in 2015, he passed through all the stages of development with flying colors. He is a Greek international, and has celebrated the great successes of PAOK’s Under-19 side (undefeated league championships. Also, he never left his studies, keeping hard at the books in the background. Proof of that is the fact that he was admitted to the TEFAA of Thessaloniki.

References

2002 births
Living people
Greek footballers
Greece youth international footballers
Super League Greece 2 players
PAOK FC players
Association football defenders
Footballers from Ioannina
PAOK FC B players